Erzurum Province may refer to:

 Erzurum Province, Turkey
 Erzurum Province, Ottoman Empire
 Erzurum Eyalet
 Erzurum Vilayet

Province name disambiguation pages